Mount Iō also Mount Iwo may refer to:
 Mount Iō (Akan), in Akan National Park in Hokkaidō.
 Mount Iō (Iōjima), in Kagoshima prefecture on the island of Iōjima.
 Mount Iō (Shiretoko), in Shiretoko National Park in Hokkaidō.
 Mount Iō (Yatsugatake), in the Southern Yatsugatake Volcanic Group of the Yatsugatake Mountains in Honshū.
 Iozen, a mountain on the border of Ishikawa and Toyama.
 One of the cones of the Kirishima group.